General Sir Frederick Ivor Maxse,  (22 December 1862 – 28 January 1958) was a senior British Army officer who fought during the First World War, best known for his innovative and effective training methods.

Early life
Ivor Maxse was the eldest of four children born to Admiral Frederick Maxse and Cecilia Steel. His siblings were Olive Hermione Maxse, and editors Violet Milner, Viscountess Milner, and Leopold Maxse. His maternal grandmother was Lady Caroline FitzHardinge, daughter of Frederick Berkeley, 5th Earl of Berkeley. He was a nephew of Sir Henry Berkeley Fitzhardinge Maxse

He was educated at Mr. Lake's Preparatory School in Caterham, Surrey from 1875 to 1877; Rugby School from 1877 to 1880 and Sandhurst from 1881 to 1882.

Early military career
Maxse was commissioned into the 7th Royal Fusiliers in 1882. He transferred to the Coldstream Guards in 1891, and served in the Egyptian Army where he was present at the Battle of Atbara and the Battle of Omdurman. In November 1899 he was in command of the 13th Sudanese Battalion during the operations leading to the defeat of the Khalifa at the Battle of Umm Diwaykarat (mentioned in despatches 25 November 1899). In recognition of his service in the Sudan, he received the brevet promotion to lieutenant-colonel on 14 March 1900. He then served in the Second Boer War (1899-1901) as a lieutenant-colonel and staff officer in the Transport Department in South Africa. He later commanded the first battalion of the Coldstream Guards from 1903 to 1907. In 1910, he was promoted to command of the 1st (Guards) Brigade.

The Great War

Division commander
In the First World War, as a divisional commander, he led the 18th (Eastern) Division when it took all its objectives on the First Day of the Battle of the Somme. He achieved this in part by hiding the division in no man's land before the battle was joined and having them closely follow the creeping barrage towards the German line. They were "probably the best fighting division possessed by the British Army in September 1916", recruited from volunteers from London and the south-east.

Corps commander
In January 1917, Maxse was given command of XVIII Corps, commanding them during the Battle of Passchendaele.

Maxse's XVIII Corps also took part in Fifth Army's defence against the German Spring Offensive, beginning on 21 March 1918. At 10.45am on 22 March Gough issued written orders to corps commanders to retreat, if heavily attacked, to the forward line ("the Green Line" in front of the Somme – in practice little more than a line of signposts and wire) of the Rear Zone. Fifth Army staff also informed corps commanders of the impending French reinforcement and Gough's hopes to withdraw III Corps to form a reserve. On receiving these messages at around noon, Maxse ordered XVIII Corps to withdraw immediately, without cover of artillery fire, and they fell back behind the Somme altogether that evening. Gough attempted to halt Maxse's withdrawal when he heard of it, but it was too late. Watts XIX Corps on Maxse's left also had to fall back.

By 24 March reinforcements – Robillot's II French Cavalry Corps (whose formations were in fact mainly infantry) — were beginning to take their place in Maxse's line. Maxse was able to hold on with the help of a counterattack by "Harman's Detachment": remnants of 2nd and 3rd Cavalry Divisions, 600 assorted infantry under a Royal Horse Artillery Officer and 8 Lewis Gun detachments from a Royal Engineer balloon Company.

Fifth Army planned a counterattack by four British brigades and 22nd French Division against a bridgehead which the Germans had made over the Somme at Pargny (threatening a breach between Watts' and Maxse's Corps). The planned counterattack did not take place as General Robillot refused to cooperate, despite a personal visit from Maxse on the morning of 25 March.

On 26 March Maxse was maintaining his place in the line, despite pressure from the French to join them in retreating south-westwards. A messenger, Paul Maze, had to be sent to the headquarters of the French General Humbert, with orders to get back XVIII Corps artillery which had been lent temporarily to the French, with orders not to leave until he had obtained written orders for its return.

Inspector General of Training
Maxse's speciality was training and he was moved from field command in June 1918, to become Inspector General of Training to the British Armies in France and the UK, to impose uniformity of training in preparing men for the combination of assault and open warfare that was to characterise the Hundred Days Offensive. Haig had him to dinner at the start of his appointment. Amongst other reforms, in September he increased the size of platoons from 3 sections back to 4 (2 of them equipped with Lewis guns), reversing a decision made in June.

Views on the Germans
During the negotiations for an armistice with Germany, Maxse claimed in a letter that:

The Hun is only wishful for peace in order to recover military power and be ready to launch a more successful attack at some opportune moment in the dim future. His heart is by no means altered. That is his nature. Recognise it. It is no use blaming him for his natural temperament, but it is wicked not to recognize what it is. His history during four wars proves it – i.e. 1864, 1866, 1870, 1914 – covering altogether a period of 64 years, two generations! He had but one objective and said so – world power...To prevent it we must crush and humiliate his Army which means his motive...let no sentimental gush be expended on the dirty Hun.

After the War Maxse was still concerned with what he perceived to be the dangerous potential of Germany. Presciently, he wrote in January 1919: "They are incapable of fighting but I am still more convinced that they will quickly recover – say in ten years? And that when they do recover they will be just the same Huns as they have been, with the result that they will revert to militarism which is the only thing they do really understand". Maxse provoked controversy when he gave a speech in November to the annual dinner of the York Gimcrack Club in which he said of the scheme for a League of Nations: "For myself, I don't understand it, and I prefer a League of Tanks to a League of Nations".

Later military career
After the War he became General Officer Commanding 9th Army Corps, stationed with the British Army of the Rhine in Germany. He went on to be General Officer Commanding-in-Chief for Northern Command from 1919 to 1923; he retired in 1926.

Later life

In 1899 Maxse had married Hon. Mary Caroline Wyndham, daughter of Henry Wyndham, 2nd Baron Leconfield of Petworth House, West Sussex.
He set up his own fruit growing company (Maxey Fruit Company) in Little Bognor, Fittleworth, near Petworth, which was successful. He was colonel of the Middlesex Regiment from 1921 to 1932.

He suffered a stroke in 1956 which incapacitated him and he moved to a nursing home in Pendean, West Lavington in Sussex until his death in 1958.
He was described as an "atheist". He is buried at St Mary's Church, Fittleworth, West Sussex.

Legacy
In his memoirs, Basil Liddell Hart described Maxse as:

...short and dark, with a sallow complexion, small deep-set eyes, and a long drooping moustache, which gave him the look of a Tartar chief—all the more because the descriptive term 'a Tartar' so aptly fitted his manner in dealing with lazy or inefficient seniors and subordinates. … Maxse seized the salient points of any idea with lightning quickness, although occasionally misjudging some point because of too hasty examination. His fierce manner concealed a very warm heart, and he particularly liked people who showed that they were not afraid of him. He was always ready to encourage and make use of new ideas.

The military historian Correlli Barnett said Maxse was "One of the ablest officers of his generation, a man of originality and drive, and a formidable personality".

Notes

References
John Baynes, Far From A Donkey. The Life of General Sir Ivor Maxse. KCB, CVO, DSO (London: Brassey's, 1995).
  (a biography of Gough)
Jonathan Nicholls, Cheerful Sacrifice: The Battle of Arras 1917 (Barnsley: Pen & Sword Books, 2006).  
Sheffield, Gary, "The Chief" (Aurum, London, 2011)  (a biography of Haig)
 UK National Archives, online

External links

Who's Who: Sir Ivor Maxse
General Sir (Frederick) Ivor Maxse, 1862–1958

|-

|-

1862 births
1958 deaths
British Army generals
Burials in Sussex
Military personnel from London
People educated at Rugby School
Graduates of the Royal Military College, Sandhurst
British Army personnel of the Mahdist War
British Army personnel of the Second Boer War
British Army generals of World War I
Companions of the Distinguished Service Order
English atheists
Knights Commander of the Order of the Bath
Commanders of the Royal Victorian Order
Deputy Lieutenants of Sussex
Royal Fusiliers officers
Coldstream Guards officers
Ivor
People from Fittleworth